Tyson Mulock (born January 20, 1983) is a Canadian-German professional ice hockey centre who is currently an unrestricted free agent who most recently played for the Grizzlys Wolfsburg of the Deutsche Eishockey Liga (DEL). Mulocks holds a German passport, his grandfather emigrated to Canada after World War II. Tyson's brother T.J. Mulock also plays professionally.

Playing career
Mulock played major junior in the Western Hockey League (WHL) for four seasons with the Medicine Hat Tigers and Regina Pats, beginning in 1999–2000. After a major junior career-high 51 points in 72 games with the Pats in 2002–03, Mulock moved to the Junior A British Columbia Hockey League (BCHL) to play one season with the Nanaimo Clippers. He scored a team-high 89 points in 59 games with the Clippers, helping lead them to a Fred Page Cup in 2004 as BCHL champions with an additional 36 points in 25 playoff games.

Undrafted by an NHL club, Mulock went overseas to Germany to play in the third-tier Oberliga (ObL) with SC Mittelrhein-Neuwied and SC Riessersee. After two seasons in the Oberliga, Mulock moved up to the 2nd Bundesliga (DEL2) where he scored a league-high 101 points with the Essen Mosquitoes. In 2007–08, he signed with the Eisbären Berlin of the top-tier Deutsche Eishockey Liga (DEL).

On April 30, 2013, Mulock left Berlin as a free agent after six seasons, and signed a one-year contract to remain in Germany with the Iserlohn Roosters. After one season with the Roosters, he moved on to fellow DEL side Grizzly Adams Wolfsburg. In January 2016, Mulock signed a contract extension that will keep him in Wolfsburg until 2018.

Career statistics

References

External links

1983 births
Canadian ice hockey centres
Eisbären Berlin players
Essen Mosquitoes players
Ice hockey people from British Columbia
Iserlohn Roosters players
Living people
Medicine Hat Tigers players
Nanaimo Clippers players
People from Delta, British Columbia
Regina Pats players
SC Riessersee players
Grizzlys Wolfsburg players
Vancouver Giants players
Canadian expatriate ice hockey players in Germany